Batshaw Youth and Family Centres (also known as Batshaw, Batshaw Centres, or Batshaw Youth and Family Services), is a government funded organization in Montreal, Quebec, Canada that is devoted to the welfare of children and their families. Batshaw is entirely funded by the Government of Québec.

History 
Batshaw was created in 1992 as a non-profit organization, used as a government agency to help children and their families. Batshaw youth and family services is an amalgamation of several other pre existing child welfare agencies; Youth Horizons, Shawbridge Youth and Family Centres, Ville-Marie Social Services (VMSS) and Mount St. Pats, that were combined to make one agency.

Name 
Batshaw Youth and Family Centres is named in honour of Manuel G. Batshaw, a social worker and renowned activist. Manuel Batshaw was in the Canadian Armed Forces before he started working in the Social Service network. Social Services.

Present 
Presently, Batshaw Youth and Family Centres runs a series of group homes across Montreal, as well as youth detention centers. A notable chain of group homes run by Batshaw is the Shawbridge Boys' Farm in the Laurentians, 75 kilometers north of Montreal.

References 
 

Organizations based in Montreal
Organizations established in 1992